Lindsay Blachford (born 6 April 1953) is a British former professional tennis player.

Blachford, who comes from London, competed on tour in the 1970s.

She had a win over American Federation Cup player Patti Hogan at the 1972 North of England Championships.

Most notably, Blachford made the round of 32 at the 1973 Wimbledon Championships, beating two other British players en route, former French Open champion Shirley Brasher and a young Sue Barker.

References

External links
 
 

1953 births
Living people
British female tennis players
English female tennis players
Tennis people from Greater London